Richard Bernard (1568–1641) was an English Puritan clergyman and writer.

Richard Bernard may also refer to:

Richard Bernard (MP for New Shoreham) ( 1377–1395), English MP for New Shoreham
Richard Bernard (Dean of Leighlin) (1787–1850), MP for Bandon Bridge and dean
Richard Bernard (cricketer) (1938–1998), English cricketer
Dick Bernard (Richard Bernard), Scottish lawn bowler

See also